Chayce is a given name. Notable people with the name include:

Chayce Beckham (born 1996), American singer-songwriter, winner of season 19 of the talent series American Idol
Chayce Jones (born 2000), Australian rules footballer

See also
Chance (name)